Flueggea suffruticosa is a species of flowering plant in the family Phyllanthaceae. It is a deciduous shrub that is widely distributed in Asia, America, Europe, and Africa. It is one of the 50 fundamental herbs used in traditional Chinese medicine, where it has the name yī yè qiū.

Uses

Folk medicine
F. suffruticosa is one of the 50 fundamental herbs in traditional Chinese medicine, where its twigs and leaves are used for the treatment of lumbago, limb numbness, and indigestion,. However, there is no scientific evidence that it has any clinical effect.

Phytochemicals 
Flueggea suffruticosa contains various alkaloids, such as securinine.

References

External links

 
 
 

suffruticosa
Flora of China
Flora of Korea
Flora of Japan
Flora of Mongolia
Flora of the Russian Far East
Flora of Siberia
Flora of Eastern Asia
Flora of Northeast Asia
Plants used in traditional Chinese medicine
Taxa named by Henri Ernest Baillon
Taxa named by Peter Simon Pallas